Manohar Kaul (1925–1999) was born in Srinagar, Kashmir. He was one of 20th century's most famous Kashmiri painters. His work is in the National Gallery of Modern Art in India.

Writings
 Kashmir: Hindu, Buddhist and Muslim architecture, Sagar Publications (1971) 
 Trends in Indian painting, ancient, medieval, modern, Dhoomimal Ramchand (1961)

External links
Essay on Kaul by the art critic Keshav Malik - includes newspaper reviews

Indian male painters
1925 births
1999 deaths
Kashmiri people
People from Srinagar
20th-century Indian painters
Painters from Jammu and Kashmir
20th-century Indian male artists